Poppletown Farmhouse is a historic home located at Esopus in Ulster County, New York.  It is a compact, two story rectangular stone house with a side facing gable roof built about 1800.

It was listed on the National Register of Historic Places in 1991.

References

Houses on the National Register of Historic Places in New York (state)
Federal architecture in New York (state)
Houses completed in 1800
Houses in Ulster County, New York
National Register of Historic Places in Ulster County, New York